Ophélie Anne-Laure Meilleroux (born 18 January 1984 in Montluçon) is a French football player who currently plays for French club Montpellier of the Division 1 Féminine. Meilleroux primarily plays as a central defender, but can also play in the defensive midfielder role. She is a member of the France women's national football team making her first major tournament appearance with her nation at UEFA Women's Euro 2009.

Club career

Early career 

Meilleroux began her career playing for the women's section of amateur football club ÉDS Montluçon in her hometown. She spent several years with the club's youth setup before being selected to attend CNFE Clairefontaine, the women's section of the prestigious Clairefontaine academy. Meilleroux played one season with the academy scoring three goals, despite playing as a defender. After leaving the academy, she joined D1 Féminine club ASJ Soyaux. At Soyaux, Meilleroux played on the team alongside future international teammate Corine Franco and earned her first call up to the national team because of her consistent play with the club. She appearing in 20 or more matches in four straight seasons for Soyaux. Meilleroux also collected a career-high nine yellow cards in her first season with the club. In her final season (2007–08) with Soyaux, Meilleroux played in 19 matches and scored only one goal.

Yzeure 

For the 2008–09 season, Meilleroux moved to Nord Allier Yzeure. Her debut season with the club was both positive and negative as Nord Allier finished in a respectable 5th-place position, however Meilleroux appeared in only ten matches. She returned to form at the start of the 2009–10 season appearing in the team's first seven matches of the season helping Yzeure reach as high as 4th position in the table. Meilleroux ultimately finished the campaign with the club appearing in 19 matches.

Montpellier 

On 9 July 2010, Meilleroux announced that she would be departing Nord Allier Yzeure to join Montpellier. She joined Montpellier as a replacement for the departed Sabrina Viguier who joined Lyon. Meilleroux was penciled in as a starter by coach Sarah M'Barek and made her club debut in the team's second league match of the season; a 2–0 win over Rodez. She consistently appeared with the team for most of the campaign before suffering an injury on 9 January 2011 in the team's 2–1 return leg victory over Rodez in the league. Meilleroux missed four matches and returned to the team on 12 February in its 5–0 win over Stade Briochin.

International career 

Meilleroux had previously starred with the women's under-19 team on two occasions. Her first time, she represented her nation at the 2002 UEFA Women's Under-19 Championship, held in Sweden. She was among the few underage players at the tournament for France. In the tournament, France finished as runners-up to champions Germany. The next season at the 2003 UEFA Women's Under-19 Championship, held in Germany, Meilleroux was installed as captain of the team and helped the team do one better winning the entire tournament. On 14 March 2003, she earned her first cap with the women's national team in a match against Denmark.
Meilleroux was a regular participant in France's qualifying for UEFA Women's Euro 2009. With that in mind, coach Bruno Bini included her in the squad for the tournament, where France crashed out in the quarterfinals losing 4–5 on penalties to the Netherlands. Meilleroux in all four matches her nation contested.

Career statistics

Club 

Statistics accurate as of 15 February 2012

International 

(Correct as of 24 October 2012)

Honours

International 

France

UEFA Women's Under-19 Championship: 2003
Cyprus Cup: 2012

References

External links 
 
 
 France player profile 

1984 births
Living people
French women's footballers
France women's international footballers
CNFE Clairefontaine players
Montpellier HSC (women) players
ASJ Soyaux-Charente players
2011 FIFA Women's World Cup players
Footballers at the 2012 Summer Olympics
Olympic footballers of France
People from Montluçon
Women's association football defenders
Division 1 Féminine players
Sportspeople from Allier
Footballers from Auvergne-Rhône-Alpes